Laura Itzel Castillo Juárez (born 16 November 1957) is a Mexican architect and politician from the Labor Party. She served as Deputy of the LVII and LXI Legislatures of the Mexican Congress representing the Federal District.

References

1957 births
Living people
Politicians from Mexico City
Women members of the Chamber of Deputies (Mexico)
Labor Party (Mexico) politicians
Mexican women architects
21st-century Mexican politicians
21st-century Mexican women politicians
20th-century Mexican architects
21st-century Mexican architects
Deputies of the LXI Legislature of Mexico
Members of the Chamber of Deputies (Mexico) for Mexico City